The Nandi Special Jury Award is given by the state government as part of its annual Nandi Awards for Telugu films since 1981.

See also
 Nandi Awards
 Cinema of Andhra Pradesh

References

Special Jury